Aerosani (both singular and plural; , literally aerosled) is a type of propeller-driven snowmobile, running on skis, used for communications, mail deliveries, medical aid, emergency recovery, and patrolling borders in northern Russia, as well as for recreation. Aerosani were used by the Soviet Red Army during the Winter War and World War II.

The first aerosani may have been built in 1903-05 by Sergei Nezhdanovsky. In 1909–10, young Igor Sikorsky tested a self-designed aerosani, before he built multi-engine airplanes and helicopters. They were very light plywood vehicles on skis, propelled by otherwise-disused vintage aircraft engines and propellers.

Military usage

Military use of the aerosani goes back to at least the 1910s. During World War I, aerosani were used for reconnaissance, communicating, and light raiding in northern areas. During the 1939–40 Winter War against Finland some were equipped with a machine gun ring mount on the roof. They could carry four or five men and tow four more on skis. The aerosani were initially used for transport, liaison, and medical evacuation in deep snow, mostly in open country and on frozen lakes and rivers because of their poor hill-climbing ability and limited maneuverability on winding forest roads.

During World War II aerosani were used for reconnaissance, communication, and light raiding in northern areas thanks to their high mobility in deep snow (25–35 km/h, where many vehicles could not move at all). Responsibility for aerosani was transferred to the Soviet Armoured Forces (GABTU) and orders were submitted for design and fabrication of lightly armoured versions, protected by ten millimetres of steel plate on the front. They were organized into transport or combat battalions of 45 vehicles, in three companies, often employed in cooperation with ski infantry. Troops were usually carried or towed by transport aerosani, while fire support was provided by the heavier machine gun-armed, armoured models. Aerosani were not used for direct assault because of their vulnerability to explosives such as mortar rounds.
  
The ANT-I through ANT-V were a successful series of aerosani of the 1920s and ’30s, designed by aircraft engineer Andrei Tupolev. A claim exists that in 1924 the Soviets obtained plans and specifications for 'air sleighs' from Chester B. Wing, an aviator, automobile dealer and former mayor of St. Ignace, Michigan, U.S.A. He had built practical aerosleds to aid transportation across the ice between St. Ignace and Mackinac Island, and for use by fishermen. The Spring 1943 issue of the magazine Science and Mechanics states that "from his aerosleds the Russians developed their present battle sled." The claim though has to be viewed in the context of a pre-World War I picture of an Igor Sikorsky machine in Kiev.

The first military aerosani used in Finland, the KM-5 and OSGA-6 (later called NKL-6), were initially built at the Narkomles Factory in Moscow. During World War II, improved NKL-16/41 and NKL-16/42 models were built, and production started at the ZiS and GAZ car factories, and at smaller industries such as the Stalingrad Bekietovskiy Wood Works. In 1941 the armoured NKL-26, designed by M. Andreyev, started production at Narkomles. The following year, Gorki Narkorechflota developed the smaller, unarmoured GAZ-98, or RF-8, powered by a GAZ-M1 truck engine and a durable metal propeller. There was also an ASD-400 heavy assault sled used in World War II.

In western sources, they are commonly referred to as 'aero-sleds'.

See also 
 Airboat
 Hydrocopter
 Ekranoplan
 Armoured fighting vehicle
 KRISTI snowcat
Multi-passenger snowmobiles

References

Bibliography 
Zaloga, Steven J., James Grandsen (1984). Soviet Tanks and Combat Vehicles of World War Two, pp. 185–87, London: Arms and Armour Press. .
 Science and Mechanics, Spring 1943, p. 49.

External links 
propeller-driven sleds at Lonesentry.com
 The Propeller-Driven Sleigh
 N007 Tupolev, aerosled with ground effect
 At the Russian Battlefield:
 Soviet Combat Snowmobiles, in English
 RF-8-GAZ-98 Snowmobile
 NKL-26 Snowmobile
 ANT-IV Snowmobile
 Boyevyye aerosani 'Combat aerosani' at Brone-Sayt (Russian language)
 Aerosani-amfibiya AS-2, a modern amphibious recreational vehicle from aircraft manufacturer Tupolev (Russian language)
 Aerosani in WWII Article in Poligon magazine, 1'2002 (at Otvaga site).

Military vehicles of the Soviet Union
Snowmobiles
Soviet inventions